

Goyul or Goyü is a township located in the Zayul County, Nyingchi Prefecture in eastern Tibet Autonomous Region, China.

The centre of the township is the town Sangachu Dzong. It is now referred to as Goyul Town.
the eastern source stream of Zayul Chu, descends into its valley. (In current European terminology, Zang Chu is in fact regarded as the main Zayul Chu, and the western headwater Kangri Karpo Chu is regarded as its tributary. However, the Tibetans regard both the rivers with equal status.)

A large plain is formed near Goyul, where three or more headwaters of Zang Chu meet. According to the British explorer Frank Kingdon Ward, four villages were formed in the plain, one of which is traditionally called Gochen, which has effectively lent its name to the entire region. The Sangachu Dzong fort and monastery stand on an elevated shoulder of the plain, while the river itself flows in a deep trench.

Prior to the Chinese administration of Tibet, Sangachu Dzong served as the  capital of the Zayul County, except for the coldest winter months, during which the Dzongpön move to the village of Shigatang (Shika) near Rima.

See also
List of towns and villages in Tibet

References

Bibliography
 
 
 

Populated places in Nyingchi